Jahan Tum Le Chalo is a 1999 Indian Hindi language film directed by Desh Deepak with music by Vishal Bhardwaj and lyrics by Gulzar.

Plot 
Shantanu Arya is a glamour photographer and a thorough womanizer. Namrata Shorey is a journalist and is quite amazingly in love with Shantanu even though she knows about his womanising ways. All her requests for marriage fall on deaf ears, as Shantanu consistently avoids commitment of any sort. Slowly she starts getting tired of his wayward ways and starts questioning her own thinking. Suddenly a young, rich man, Aakash enters her life and provides her the much-needed respite from her mundane lifestyle. Aakash is apparently in love with her. But Namrata reminds him of their age difference and the fact that she has given herself tan aur man se to Shantanu. Meanwhile, sensing the growing proximity of Aakash and Namrata and getting rebukes from other girls, Shantanu finally agrees for the marriage. Namrata does a long wait for Shantanu at wedding place but he doesn't reach there till late night and finally as she exits from there, she finds Aakash there and at last, she accepts him.

Cast 
Sonali Kulkarni as Namrata Shorey
Jimmy Sheirgill as Aakash
Nirmal Pandey as Shantanu Arya
Nirupa Roy as Dadi Maa

Music
"Dekho To Aasman Taro Se Bhar Gaya" - Suresh Wadkar
"Atthanisi Zindagi" - Hariharan
"Shauq Khwab Ka Hai Wo Nind Aaye Na" - Lata Mangeshkar
"Thak Gayi Ho To" - Suresh Wadkar
"Ye Kaisi Chap Kadmo Ki Sunai De Rahi Hai" - Rekha Bhardwaj
"Your Face Is Face Of Love" - Gary Lawyer

References

External links 

Films scored by Vishal Bhardwaj
1990s Hindi-language films